The 2017 Italian LNP Cup, knows as the Turkish Airlines Cup for sponsorship reasons, was the 19th edition of the tournament. The competition was organised by Lega Nazionale Pallacanestro (LNP) for Serie A2 clubs. The tournament was played from 3 to 5 March 2017 at the Unipol Arena in Bologna.

Givova Scafati were the defending champions.

Segafredo Virtus Bologna went to win his first LNP Cup by beating Angelico Biella 69–68 in the Finals. Marco Spissu was named Finals MVP of the competition.

Qualification
Eight teams, four in each group (East and West) qualified for the Cup are the best ranked teams at the end of the first stage of 2016–17 Serie A2 season.

East Group
1. Segafredo Virtus Bologna
2. De' Longhi Treviso
3. Alma Trieste
4. Dinamica Mantova

West Group
1. Angelico Biella
2. TWS Legnano
3. UniCusano Roma
4. Moncada Agrigento

Source: LNP

Bracket

Games

Quarterfinals

Semifinals

Final

Sponsors

Source: LNP Cup

References

External links
LNP Cup  Retrieved 1 March 2017

2016–17 in Italian basketball
Serie A2 Basket